Wayne R. Kreklow (born January 4, 1957) is an American volleyball coach and former professional basketball player. Kreklow won an NBA championship with the Boston Celtics in 1981. He was the women's volleyball coach at the University of Missouri from 2005 through the 2018 season. Kreklow retired in July 2019.

Early life
Kreklow was born in Neenah, Wisconsin. Wayne is the son of Wayne Sr. (d. 2018) and Joanne. He is one of six Kreklow children. His father coached and taught for 42 years.

Kreklow played on the 1975 state championship basketball team at Neenah High School. Kreklow scored 23 points in Neenah's state quarterfinal loss in 1974. Kreklow led the 1975 Wisconsin State High School Basketball Tournament in scoring with 69 points, including 19 in Neenah's 64–55 victory over Milwaukee Marshall in the WIAA Class A final.

In leading Neenah to the 1975 WIAA state basketball title, Kreklow scored 499 points in 1974–1975 and 926 for his career. Kreklow was the 1975 Wisconsin Player of the Year. He also played volleyball in high school.

College career (1975–1979)
A 6'4" (1.93 m) guard, Kreklow played basketball at Drake University in Des Moines, Iowa, a member of the Missouri Valley Conference. He was also recruited by Minnesota, Wisconsin and Marquette among others.

As a freshman in 1975–1976, Kreklow averaged 8.0 points and 2.9 rebounds and 2.2 assists for the 8–19 Drake Bulldogs under Coach Bob Ortegel. He averaged 11.2 points,  4.8 rebounds and 2.4 assists, with Drake finishing 10–17 as a sophomore. As a junior in 1977–1978, Kreklow averaged 15.2 points 3.2 rebounds and 2.6 assists, as Drake finished 6–22.

As a senior in 1978–1979, Kreklow averaged 19.5 points, 4.7 rebounds and 3.1 assists as Drake improved to 15–12.

Overall, Kreklow averaged 13.9 points, 3.5 rebounds and 2.6 assists in 109 career games at Drake, leaving Drake as the program's third leading all-time scorer.

Professional career (1979–1983)
Kreklow was the 3rd round (53rd overall) pick of the Boston Celtics in the  1979 NBA draft.

Kreklow participated in the Celtics 1979 training camp, but he did not make the team. He played the 1979–80 season for the Maine Lumberjacks of the Continental Basketball Association, averaging 9.6 points per game.

In 25 NBA games with Boston in 1980–1981, Kreklow averaged 1.2 points per game, as the Celtics won the 1981 NBA Championship.

"I was very much of a support player. I wasn't one of the main guys in the rotation," Kreklow said of his Celtic tenure. "My job was to make guys work as hard as they could in practice and challenge them, and make sure they were playing to their potential. That was my time — practice."

"It was a pretty remarkable group of guys. They were mature, they were professional," Kreklow added about the Celtic's Championship. "There's a reason that certain teams tend to win championships and be really successful because they're not only good players, but they have character and they're good people."

After being invited back to Boston camp and playing in 1985 for Sydney Supersonics in Australia, Kreklow played for the Wisconsin Flyers of the CBA in 1982–1983.

Volleyball coaching
Kreklow coached Columbia College to NAIA national volleyball titles and undefeated seasons in 1998 and 1999.

Kreklow was the head women's volleyball coach of University of Missouri volleyball team from 2005 thru the 2018 season, and coached alongside his wife Susan since 2000. He retired from coaching in July 2019. The Tigers reached 14 NCAA Tournaments in the Kreklow's tenure.

"For me, I want to win," Kreklow said. "I want to win championships. I want to do all that kind of stuff. But that, to me, is the secondary by-product of doing things the right way."

Honors
 The Neenah Joint School District inducted Kreklow into their Hall of Fame in 2015.
 Kreklow was selected to the Wisconsin Basketball Coaches Association Hall of Fame in 2008.
 In 2016, Kreklow was inducted into the Missouri Sports Hall of Fame, along with his wife Susan.

References

External links

Wayne Kreklow Profile at the University of Missouri

1957 births
Living people
American expatriate basketball people in Australia
American men's basketball players
Basketball players from Wisconsin
Boston Celtics draft picks
Boston Celtics players
Drake Bulldogs men's basketball players
Maine Lumberjacks players
Missouri Tigers women's volleyball coaches
Shooting guards
Sportspeople from Neenah, Wisconsin
Wisconsin Flyers players